Private police or special police are law enforcement bodies that are owned and/or controlled by non-governmental entities. Additionally, the term can refer to an off-duty police officer while working for a private entity, providing security, or otherwise law enforcement-related services. These officers do have power to uphold the laws under the discretion of the private company.

In jurisdictions that allow private police, private police may be employed and paid for by a non-governmental agency, such as a railroad, or port, or university, or nuclear facility, or hospital, but they are peace officers or law enforcement officers that are commissioned, licensed, and regulated by the state. They are required to swear an oath to uphold the laws of the state where they are commissioned and follow the same regulations peace officers / law enforcement officers must abide by. The main difference between a private police officer and a regular police officer is who is signing their paycheck and their jurisdiction.

Many people confuse private police with security guards, but they are not the same thing. Not all security guards have police power, whereas private police are sworn police officers employed by private entities, or even small governmental departments (such as library police, etc.).

Private police departments receive their commissions from the state (or counties, municipalities, etc.), but are generally not considered government actors.  Security officers are regulated by the state, but generally do not have police powers, such as the ability to arrest on a warrant, or issue citations and summons for misdemeanor offenses.

Types of officers and terminology

Private police

Private police (also called company police) are commissioned police officers that are hired by a non-governmental agency, such as a university, hospital, port, nuclear facility, railroad, etc. These police officers swear an oath to the state or country (or both) they are commissioned in but are paid for by the private organization that hired them. Depending on the jurisdiction, they may have full police power within their jurisdictions or limited police powers. Private police officers are held to the same regulations and standards as regular police officers.  Sometimes (but not all times) these officers are commissioned as "special police," the special-term delineating their narrow jurisdiction.

Special police

In some countries, like the United States, the term "special police" indicates a police force that has limited law enforcement powers. Special police may be employed by either a governmental agency or a non-governmental agency, and as such are not always private police.

Some states give local officials the ability to appoint special police officers with specific duties, either to assist local law enforcement or to provide assistance during an emergency. These officers may or may not be commissioned police officers, but generally have the same privileges and immunities as police officers. For example, some municipalities appoint special police as security for the municipal buildings and airports, freeing up commissioned police officers for general police duties. Special Police officers can be public officers (such as the WMATA Special Police in DC), or private officers, such as the Metro Special Police Department's Special Police Officers).

Railroad police are sometimes classified as special police, but other times are recognized as fully-commissioned police officers under the Ombudsmen's Act, granting them multi-state jurisdiction.

Off-duty police officers

In jurisdictions that allow it, off-duty officers may be employed to provide security to individuals, or companies, or organizations. If their jurisdiction grants them police powers on and off-duty, they essentially become private police while employed by anyone other than the government.

The use of public police officers under private pay has become more and more contentious, as it is felt to be unfair competition against private security firms.

Security guards

Security guards are, by definition, not private police since they are not commissioned police officers. They are usually regulated by the government but lack the many of the same police powers commissioned police officers are granted.  Security officers are limited to their assigned properties (even if they travel between multiple properties), and can only take the action on public streets that a citizen might take.  Security agencies range from "slick-belt" companies that merely observe and report incidents to police, to more well trained security agencies that detain subjects committing crimes, and have good relationships with their local police departments.

Government entities may employ private security personnel via contract, while others have their own security departments.  Sometimes these officers have special police commissions, and some do not.

Security personnel can also take on auxiliary functions of police duties, such as administrative work, which constitutes a signification proportion of the workload of officers. It has been argued that police, who cost more than private security guards, are overqualified for such auxiliary duties because of their extensive training. One study found that outsourcing such functions to private contractors could reduce police forces’ operational expenditures by between 17% and 20% in the Canadian province of Quebec. The same study cited similar measures in the UK, which led to reductions in both crime rates and public expenditures on police.

Examples

Canada
As in the United States, the largest private police forces in Canada are the railway police forces of the two largest rail carriers: Canadian Pacific Police Service (Canadian Pacific Railway) and Canadian National Police (Canadian National Railway). Both police forces' jurisdictions extend into those U.S. states where the respective companies operate. VIA Rail Canada Inc. also operate an armed police service, the VIA Rail Canada Police Service; however, they are a Crown Corporation under the purview of the Department of Transport Canada.

South Africa

An increasing number of South Africans are using private security companies to protect themselves and their assets. The broad private security industry is employing over 200,000 security guards throughout the country, of which the guarding industry is the largest, with 125,000 guards working for approximately 3,200 security companies. Many of the larger South African private security companies have expanded their operations into other countries in Southern Africa. Private security companies have even involved themselves in political conflicts that are occurring on the subcontinent. In South Africa, private companies that make use of guards are regulated by a statutory body, the Security Officers' Board. The Board polices the regulations that govern the private security industry and sets minimum training standards for security guards.

United Kingdom
A number of Port Police forces exist within the UK that are run by the respective port authorities, which are private companies. Legislation relating to Port Police dates back to the Harbours, Docks and Piers Clauses Act 1847, although subsequent legislation has been passed in relation to specific ports. Most Port Police have jurisdiction within 1 mile of port property. However, the Marine Navigation Act 2013 allows the Chief Constable of the local force to grant a port police force jurisdiction throughout England and Wales in relation to port business. The legislation was enacted after it emerged that the Port of Dover Police were acting unlawfully when transporting prisoners to custody when it was over a mile away from port property.

Until 2003, Oxford University both had a private police force, who had standard constabulary powers within 4 miles of any university building. In 2002, a group of local traders in Oxford wrote to Evan Harris, a local Member of Parliament, requesting the removal of the police powers of the Constables over citizens who were not members of the university. They argued that the Constables were "not accountable to any public authority" and described their role as an "anachronism".

After a policy review by the University Council in 2003, the Oxford University Police was disbanded when it was decided that it would be too expensive to bring the force up to the required standard of training and implement a multi-tiered complaints procedure.

United States

In the United States, these can be firms to which the government contracts out police work (e.g. the 1975–1977 Oro Valley, Arizona-Rural/Metro contract, the 1980 Reminderville, Ohio-Corporate Security contract, the 1976 Indian Springs, Florida-Guardsmark contract, and the 1976 Buffalo Creek, West Virginia-Guardsmark contract), or they can be officers who contract with various firms to patrol the area, as in the case of the San Francisco Patrol Specials.

Private police officers are different from security officers, who generally do not have arrest powers beyond a citizen's arrest if they have probable cause to do so.  Private police officers have very differing powers and regulations, generally do have law enforcement powers (even if limited to the properties they are assigned to protect), such as in North Carolina, Virginia, Washington, D.C., Maryland, Pennsylvania, New York, Illinois, and more.

A specific type of private police is company police, such as the specialized railroad police or mall security. In some cases, private police are sworn in as government employees in order to ensure compliance with the law, as in the Kalamazoo, Michigan-Charles Services contract, which lasted 3 years. Private police services are sometimes called "Subscription-Based Patrol." The largest private police forces in the United States are the railroad police employed by the major Class I railroads.

Private security firms in the U.S. employ more security guards, patrol personnel and detectives than the U.S. federal, state and local governments combined, fulfilling many of the beat-patrol functions once thought central to the mission of public police. It has been argued that the private police market furnishes tangible evidence about what people want but are not receiving from public police. The growth of private policing is a phenomenon that is occurring all over the world. In Australia, private and public police have conventionally been considered parallel systems, with private security as very much the lesser or junior entity.

In Boston, Massachusetts, more than 100 housing projects and low-income apartment buildings are some times patrolled by private security. A few of these companies employ Special Police Officers that are licensed and trained through the City of Boston. These Special Police officers do meet the state's standard of a special police officer. These Special Police Officers in Boston get their power from BPD rule 400. In 2021, Boston special police officers lost their commissions due to laws passed due to police reform.

In North Carolina, private police are certified company police agencies governed by the North Carolina Department of Justice chapter 74E of the Company Police Act. Under 74E Company Police in North Carolina can, and do make arrests, and write citations for violations of the law the same as any municipal police officer. Company Police jurisdiction is on any real property that they own, possess and control, or have been contracted to protect by the owner or person in control, unless they are in continuous pursuit for a crime that was committed in their jurisdiction or investigating a crime that occurred in their jurisdiction. Private police in North Carolina must meet or exceed all training and certification requirements as any municipal, county or state law enforcement officer.

In South Carolina, all Security Officers have the authority and power to make an arrest just as Sheriff's Deputies do (although this is unique for the USA).  In (Spring Valley HOA) Columbia, South Carolina, Private Officers respond to calls for service, run traffic radar, make arrests and use blue lights.  Security Officers in South Carolina are Law Enforcement under state law, case law and the Attorney General's opinions, and are authorized by the state to issue Uniform Traffic Tickets to violators and make arrests for violations of state laws. Security Officers are considered Private Law Enforcement Officers.

In Washington, D.C., special police officers have full law enforcement authority on the properties they are assigned to protect. There are both private police officers Metro Special Police, Shasthra Special Police, and PChange Special Police, and public/governmental officers, such as the University of the District of Columbia Police, DC Library Police, and special police officers working for WMATA. They all have the authority to make arrests for felonies and misdemeanors, and to utilize blue and white lights on their vehicles. New York City The MTA police is a privatize police force that gets State funding. It is part of the New York City transit Authority Police also extends to the LIRR Long Island Train service.

Relationship to anarcho-capitalism
Private police figures prominently in anarcho-capitalist theory and, along with advocacy of private defense agencies, dispute resolution organizations, and private production of law, distinguishes it from minarchism. It is argued that complete privatization of the police function (with funding, control, ownership, etc. of all police forces passing to private entities) would eliminate the ability of the state to forcibly collect taxes, and that arguably the only way it could work would be within the context of a society in which all other services were privatized as well. However, Edward Stringham has pointed out numerous examples to the contrary.

History
In Great Britain, the police function was historically performed by private watchmen (existing from 1500 on), thief-takers, and so on. The former were funded by private individuals and organizations and the latter by privately funded rewards for catching criminals, who would then be compelled to return stolen property or pay restitution.

In 1737, George II began paying some London and Middlesex watchmen with tax money, beginning the shift to government control. In 1750, Henry Fielding began organizing a force of quasi-professional constables. The Macdaniel affair added further impetus for a publicly salaried police force that did not depend on rewards. Nonetheless, in 1828 there were privately financed police units in no fewer than 45 parishes within a 10-mile radius of London as the governmental London Metropolitan Police was just beginning.

Perceived advantages

Advantages of private police for institutions and organizations 

Benefits for having private police (instead of security guards) for railroads, ports, universities, schools, hospitals, and other organizations include:

 Since they are commissioned police officers, and not just security guards:
 they can do things security guards can't do since they have additional powers granted by the state, including the power to arrest.
 they have the same privileges and immunities as police officers since they are commissioned police officers.
 The state regulates the private police and private police officers are held to higher standards than security guards are.
 The cost of the private police is shifted to the organization utilizing the police officers, and not to taxpayers. 
 The police officers often specialize. For example, university police are trained to deal specifically with students, faculty, and dangers common to university campuses.
 The private police and regular police can engage in mutual assistance agreements, allowing them to work together.
 Municipal, county, parish, state, federal, or national police can use their resources elsewhere. Home security officers in gated communities like gated Residential neighborhoods may be considered private police if given arrest powers and the Right to give out warrants and tickets according to the Home owners association (HOA).

Advantages of private police as contractees of states 

There is evidence that private police can provide services more cheaply than public police. The cost of San Francisco's private patrol specials is $25–30/hour, compared to $58/hour for an off-duty police officer. In Reminderville, Ohio, Corporate Security outbid the Summit County Sheriff Department's offer to charge the community $180,000 per year for 45-minute response time emergency service by offering a $90,000 contract for twice as many patrol cars and a 6-minute response time.

Advantages of private police as contractees of private citizens 

Another advantage cited by Benson is that private police would have a contractual responsibility to protect their customers. In Warren v. District of Columbia, the court found that public police have no such responsibility. Thus, private police can be sued if they fail to respond to calls for help, for instance.

James F. Pastor addresses the disadvantages by analyzing a number of substantive legal and public policy issues which directly or indirectly relate to the provision of security services. These can be demonstrated by the logic of alternative or supplemental service providers. This is illustrated by the concept of "para-police." Para-police is another name for private police officers. Many public safety agencies use auxiliary police officers, who are part-time sworn police officers. Some also use reserve police officers, who are hired on an "as needed" basis, with limited police powers. These officers are typically called to duty for special details or events.  In contrast to auxiliary and reserve officers, private policing is a relatively new and growing phenomenon. However, there are historical precedents such as the watchmen of medieval and early modern England and the Santa Hermandad of medieval and early modern Spain. These eventually became government-funded police, but some were originally privately organized.

There are several key distinctions between these options. Briefly, the distinctions relate to the level of police powers associated with the officer, the training levels required for each officer, the funding sources for the service provision, and the contractual and liability exposures related to each supplemental arrangement. Each alternative or supplemental service has its own strengths and weaknesses. The use of private police, however, has particular appeal because property or business owners can directly contract for public safety services, thereby providing welcome relief for municipal budgets. Finally, private police functions can be flexible, depending upon the financial, organizational, political, and situational circumstances of the client.

Under anarcho-capitalism, citizens would not have to fund police services through taxation. One argument against such a policy is that it would disadvantage the poor, who could not afford to spend much money on police. Thus, some more moderate libertarians favor issuing police vouchers to each citizen, granting them a certain amount of money to hire a private police company of their choice at taxpayer expense.

Murray Rothbard notes, "police service is not 'free'; it is paid for by the taxpayer, and the taxpayer is very often the poor person himself. He may very well be paying more in taxes for police now than he would in fees to private, and far more efficient, police companies. Furthermore, the police companies would be tapping a mass market; with the economies of such a larger-scale market, police protection would undoubtedly be much cheaper."

Public police are limited in size by the political jurisdiction, although some local public police forces already contract with national private firms for specialty services, such as maintenance of communications equipment, for which it would not be economical for them to hire a full-time government employee.

Perceived disadvantages
Problems within the industry include the possibility of criminals setting up their own firms, misuse of surveillance devices, and strained relationships between the public and private police.

Ultimately, some people see the potential for a “dual system” of policing—one for the wealthy and one for the poor—and others see the provision of private security as the primary protective resource in the contemporary United States.

In Florida, Critical Intervention Services patrols neighborhoods and has deployed lethal force before. They have limited power, like other private security agencies in the state, regulated by Florida Statute 493.

There are regulatory mechanisms for private police, specifically the commissioning bodies of those agencies (such as the state's POST board, etc.).  Additionally, people have the ability to file lawsuits more freely, as these officers are not protected by the sovereign immunity doctrine that defends municipal/governmental police personnel.  In Florida, complaints can be made through the Florida Department of Law Enforcement.

Vagueness of the definition of "private police"

"Policing" and "private policing" are somewhat elusive concepts. "Private sector" police have been described as "any individual or group involved with law enforcement or security, but lacking official police authority." However, in many jurisdictions - particularly in the United States - private police agencies and or officers generally do have some form of statutory authority. At the core of the policing concept, though, is the combating of crime. Patrick Tinsley writes:

Private police, as conceptualised by Elizabeth E. Joh, would typically focus on loss instead of crime; preventive methods rather than punishment; private justice (such as firing embezzlers or issuing no trespassing warnings to shoplifters) rather than public court proceedings; and private property rather than public property.

See also

Police foundation
Private investigator
Privatization in criminal justice
Security guard
Watchman (law enforcement)
Law enforcement agency
Law enforcement and society

References

 
Law enforcement units